Cooksland is a hamlet in Cornwall, England, UK. It is on the A30 main road about one mile northeast of Bodmin. It is in the civil parish of St Breward

References

Hamlets in Cornwall